Alone is the sixth, and to date, final album by American doom metal band Solitude Aeturnus, released in November 2006. The album cover was created by Travis Smith.

Track listing 
All music by Solitude Aeturnus. All lyrics by Robert Lowe, except "Lucid Destitution" by Heather Hunt.

  "Scent of Death"   – 9:42
  "Waiting for the Light"  – 4:41
  "Blessed Be the Dead"  – 5:03
  "Sightless"  – 4:24
  "Upon Within"  – 7:56
  "Burning"  – 8:42
  "Is There"  – 8:01
  "Tomorrows Dead"  – 6:26
  "Essence of Black"  – 5:35
  "Lucid Destitution"  – 10:10 (bonus track on digipak edition)

The track "Lucid Destitution" was originally titled "Embrace" but changed at the last minute.

Credits
 John Perez – guitars
Robert Lowe – vocals and keyboards
 Steve Moseley – guitar
 James Martin – bass
 Steve Nichols – drums
 Jason Spradlin – tamboura on "Scent of Death"
 Paul Morgan – photography
 Solitude Aeturnus – production
 Sterling Winfield – engineering
 J.T. Longoria – engineering, mix engineering
 Greg Adams – assistant engineering
 Gary long – mastering

References

Solitude Aeturnus albums
2006 albums
Massacre Records albums